Matthew Nyindam (born December 1, 1975) is a Ghanaian politician and member of the Seventh Parliament of the Fourth Republic of Ghana representing the Kpandai Constituency in the Northern Region on the ticket of the New Patriotic Party.

Personal life 
Nyindam is a Christian (Catholic). He is married (with four children).

Early life and education 
Nyindam was born on December 1, 1975. He hails from Kumdi, a town in the Northern Region of Ghana. He entered University of Education, Winneba and obtained his Bachelor in Education degree in Social Studies in 2007.

Politics 
Nyindam is a member of the New Patriotic Party (NPP). In 2012, he contested for the Kpandai seat on the ticket of the NPP sixth parliament of the fourth republic and won.

Employment 
 Ghana Education Service (tutor, Barikese SHS, Kumasi)
 Member of Parliament (January 7, 2013–present; 2nd term)

References

Ghanaian MPs 2017–2021
1975 births
Living people
New Patriotic Party politicians